Hal Ronald Varian (born March 18, 1947, in Wooster, Ohio) is Chief Economist at Google and holds the title of emeritus professor at the University of California, Berkeley where he was founding dean of the School of Information. Varian is an economist specializing in microeconomics and information economics.

Early life
Hal Varian was born on March 18, 1947, in Wooster, Ohio. He received his B.S. from MIT in economics in 1969 and both his M.A. in mathematics and Ph.D. in economics from the University of California, Berkeley in 1973.

Career
Varian taught at MIT, Stanford University, the University of Oxford, the University of Michigan, the University of Siena and other universities around the world. He has two honorary doctorates, from the University of Oulu, Finland in 2002, and a Dr. h. c. from the Karlsruhe Institute of Technology (KIT), Germany, awarded in 2006. He is emeritus professor at the University of California, Berkeley, where he was founding dean of the School of Information.

Varian joined Google in 2002 as chief economist, and has worked on the design of advertising auctions, econometrics, finance, corporate strategy, and public policy.

Varian is the author of two bestselling textbooks: Intermediate Microeconomics, an undergraduate microeconomics text, and  Microeconomic Analysis, an advanced text aimed primarily at first-year graduate students in economics. Together with Carl Shapiro, he co-authored Information Rules: A Strategic Guide to the Network Economy and The Economics of Information Technology: An Introduction. According to the Open Syllabus Project, Varian is the fourth most frequently cited author on college syllabi for economics courses.

Personal life
Varian is married and has one child, Christopher Max Varian.

See also
 Varian Rule
 Varian's theorems

References

External links
 Hal Varian's Website
 Position Auctions
 

1947 births
Living people
People from Wooster, Ohio
Haas School of Business faculty
Google employees
Microeconomists
20th-century American economists
21st-century American economists
Massachusetts Institute of Technology faculty
University of Michigan faculty
Stanford University faculty
Fellows of the Econometric Society
MIT School of Humanities, Arts, and Social Sciences alumni
UC Berkeley College of Letters and Science alumni
Fellows of the American Academy of Arts and Sciences
Distinguished Fellows of the American Economic Association
Economists from Ohio
University of California, Berkeley School of Information faculty
Nancy L. Schwartz Memorial Lecture speakers
Fair division researchers